Ganeshwar Kusum (21 March 1934 – 24 December 2021) was an Indian politician.

He was a Member of Parliament, representing Odisha in the Rajya Sabha, the upper house of India's Parliament, as a member of the Indian National Congress. Kusum died on 24 December 2021, at the age of 87.

References

1934 births
2021 deaths
Indian National Congress politicians from Odisha
Rajya Sabha members from Odisha